Star Swamp Bushland Reserve  is a bushland reserve occupying about half of the land area of the suburbs of Watermans Bay and North Beach in the northern suburbs of Perth, Western Australia. The precise origin of the name is unknown, but the earliest known use of the name was on a lease application by J.H.Okely of Wanneroo in 1868.

In 1987, the State Government set aside  as an A-class reserve, and funding from the Bicentennial Commemorative Program and assistance from local organisations facilitated the establishment of the Star Swamp Heritage Trail within the reserve.

Star Swamp contains a history trail that spans a  walk. The trail contains ten points of interest, each marked with a plaque and sign.

Star Swamp has been the site of many bushfires.

References

Swan Coastal Plain
Nature reserves in Western Australia
North Beach, Western Australia